Alfred State College (ASC, SUNY Alfred, SUNY Alfred State) is a public college in Alfred, New York.  It is part of the State University of New York (SUNY) system. The college, formerly the Technical College at Alfred, offers bachelor's and associate degree program. It is accredited by the Middle States Commission on Higher Education and is a member of the Rochester Area Colleges consortium.

History 
Both Alfred University and Alfred State have their roots in an early teaching college called the Alfred Select School. The school was visionary in its equal opportunity policy. In 1908 President Boothe C. Davis of Alfred University persuaded the New York State legislature to locate the New York State School of Agriculture at the Alfred University Campus; the resulting allocation of $75,000 for three buildings, a farm, livestock, and machinery would set plans for the school in motion.

In 1937, the School of Engineering Technologies was founded by the original three academic faculty members; Al French, Bill Harrison and Herm Sickler. Four years later, the school was given junior college status and renamed the New York State Agricultural and Technical College at Alfred.

By 1948, the enrollment grew to such large numbers that the state government decided to allow it room to expand, moving the school across Main Street from Alfred University, where it remains today. In addition to a new campus would come greater autonomy, meaning that Alfred would now have two state-funded schools.

Schools and departments
Alfred State offers 80 majors in the arts, applied technology, architecture and management and engineering technology. Teaching staff  are in a 17:1 ratio to students, and are generally well-educated in their field, while maintaining ties to their profession.

The college is divided into the following schools:

 The School of Arts & Sciences
 The School of Applied Technology (located at the Wellsville campus)
 The School of Architecture, Management and Engineering Technology

Annual festivals
In 1972 two Alfred University students started a charity festival titled "Hot Dog Day." This festival was to be a charity fundraiser for the area. Now held in the third weekend of April, Hot Dog Day is a yearly celebration coordinated through both Alfred University and Alfred State.

Beginning in the fall of 2008, Alfred State began hosting its annual Homecoming and Family Weekend Celebration.

Student government
The Student Senate of Alfred State administers over half a million dollars in club and administrative funds through the Student Activity Fee. Student Senate supports, facilitates, and leads its clubs and organizations through an annual Leadership Retreat, weekly leadership seminars, and various special projects. In addition to funding, Student Senate allows students of both Wellsville and Alfred main campus to participate in collaborative decision-making processes. The Student Senate General Assembly has voting rights on the board of trustees of the college, known as the College Council, through its College Council Representative. The Student Senate General Assembly also has a voice on the Faculty Senate with a non-voting member but has voting members on many committees including the Academic Affairs Committee. They also have three members on the Auxiliary Campus Enterprises and Services board of directors.

Facilities and construction
Founded with three buildings, a farm, and some livestock, Alfred State has expanded to include 13 residence halls, state-of-the-art smart classrooms, a motorsports facility, an organic farm, the Orvis Activities Center, as well as a second campus of Applied Technology located in Wellsville, NY.

Pioneer Stadium accommodates Soccer and Football, and is surrounded by an 8-lane running track. Facilities also include a Central Dining Hall, a 150-bed townhouse complex, an Engineering Technology Building, and a Student Leadership Center.

Greek life
Currently 6 fraternities and 6 sororities are recognized by the college and Greek Senate: Kappa Sigma Epsilon, Gamma Chapter of the Theta Gamma Fraternity fraternity, Mu Theta (ΜΘ) fraternity, Psi Sigma Psi (ΨΣΨ) sorority, Alpha Beta Chi (ABX) sorority, Pi Nu Epsilon (ΠΝΕ) sorority, Delta Chi Omega (ΔΧΩ) sorority, Alpha Sigma (ΑΣ) sorority, and Zeta Psi Omega (ΖΨΩ) sorority are all fully recognized by the college.

Greek Senate has developed an autonomous Greek Judicial Board which allows for the full self-governance of the Alfred Greek System, adjudicating cases of organizational misconduct. Hazing is not allowable by any organization on campus (enforced by state law), but most especially in any fraternity or sorority. Regardless of recognition status all members of the campus community are expected to abide by college policy and all applicable laws.

Museums and galleries
The Bret Llewellyn Art Gallery at SUNY Alfred State in Alfred, NY, founded in 2010, is located in the campus Engineering Technology Building.

Athletics

Alfred State athletic teams are the Pioneers. The college is a member of the Division III level of the National Collegiate Athletic Association (NCAA), primarily competing in the Allegheny Mountain Collegiate Conference (AMCC) for most of its sponsored sports since the 2019–20 academic year. The Pioneers also compete as a member of the Eastern Collegiate Athletic Conference, the Eastern Collegiate Football Conference (ECFC) for football, the Colonial States Athletic Conference (CSAC) for men's and women's indoor and outdoor track & field, and the Empire Collegiate Wrestling Conference (ECWC) for wrestling. They also previously competed in the short-lived American Collegiate Athletic Association (ACAA) from 2017–18 to 2018–19; and as an NCAA D-III Independent from 2013–14 to 2016–17.

Alfred State competes in 17 intercollegiate varsity sports: Men's sports include baseball, basketball, cross country, football, soccer, swimming & diving, track & field (indoor and outdoor) and wrestling; while women's sports include basketball, cross country, soccer, softball, swimming & diving, track & field (indoor and outdoor) and volleyball.

Throughout its athletics history, the college was a longtime member of the National Junior College Athletic Association (NJCAA), primarily competing in the Western New York Athletic Conference (WNYAC) until after the 2012–13 school year. The NCAA Division III Management Council announced in April 2013 that Alfred State has been accepted as provisional members. The announcement moved Alfred State into NCAA Division III competition, effective in the 2013–14 school year. Alfred State became a full member of Division III of the NCAA in the summer of 2018.

References

External links

 
 Official athletics website

 
Universities and colleges in Allegany County, New York
1908 establishments in New York (state)
Educational institutions established in 1908
USCAA member institutions
Public universities and colleges in New York (state)